The Vanji language, also spelt Vanchi and Vanži, is an extinct Iranian language, one of the areal group of Pamir languages. It was spoken in the Vanj River valley in what is now the Gorno-Badakhshan Autonomous Region of Tajikistan.

In the 19th century the region was forcibly annexed to the Bukharan Emirate and a campaign of violent assimilation undertaken, and by the end of the 19th century, the Vanji language had completely disappeared, displaced by Tajik Persian as a result of assimilation.

Documentation
The Russian linguist Ivan Ivanovich Zarubin was the first to assess the language in the early 20th century, by which time it was already extinct. Zarubin was able to collect only words and phrases recalled by older inhabitants of the region as having been spoken by their grandparents who still knew something of the language, and he considered it one of the Pamir languages.

Features
The language as reconstructed had a phonology consisting of the stop consonants p, b, t, d, k, g and q, the fricative consonants f, v, θ, ð, s, z, ʃ, ʒ, x, ɣ, χ, ʁ and h, the affricate consonants t͡ʃ and d͡ʒ and the sonorants m, w, n, r, l, j and ŋ as well as the vowels a, e, ẹ, i, ə, o, ü and u. Much less can be discerned about the grammar of Vanji: there were probably two genders, masculine and feminine, with plurals of nouns formed by adding a suffix -ev, comparative forms of adjectives by adding -tar and Infinitives of verbs were formed by adding -ak.

References 

 

Pamir languages
Eastern Iranian languages
Languages of Tajikistan
Extinct languages of Asia
Languages extinct in the 19th century